Kačiče–Pared is a settlement in the Municipality of Divača in the Littoral region of Slovenia.

Geography
Gallows Cave lies northwest of the settlement. In the mid-20th century older residents recalled finding beams set up in the rock near the cave reputed to be gallows dating back to French rule under the Illyrian Provinces. Gallows were also erected at the site by Count Petazzi.

Name
The name of the settlement was changed from Kačiče to Kačiče–Pared in 1952.

Church
The local church is dedicated to the Nativity of Mary and belongs to the Parish of Rodik.

References

External links 

Kačiče–Pared on Geopedia

Populated places in the Municipality of Divača